Astei is a village (a selo) in the Berehove Raion (district) of Zakarpattia Oblast in western Ukraine. In the immediate vicinity of the village is the Luzhanka border checkpoint on the border with Hungary.

History
Astei was first mentioned in 1492. From the 14th to 17th centuries, the village was owned by various feudal lords. In 1566 the village, was subjected to a devastating raid by the Crimean Tatars. In 1946, by decree of the Soviet Ukrainian authorities, the village of Astei was renamed Luzhanka. In 1991, the its historic name was restored.

References

Villages in Berehove Raion